Thomas Aitchison Parkin (born 1 February 1956) is an English retired professional football midfielder. His nephews, Jacob Murphy and Josh Murphy, also became professional footballers.

Career
Born in Gateshead, Parkin spent his youth career with Ipswich Town and turned professional with Ipswich in December 1973, He was sent out on loan to Grimsby Town during the 1975–76 season and then to Peterborough United the following season. Later in 1977 he was loaned to Connecticut Bicentennials of the North American Soccer League. He made his Ipswich debut against Cardiff City in the third round of the FA Cup on 7 January 1978. Ipswich went on to win the FA Cup that season but Parkin wasn't part of the squad for the final itself. Parkin had made fewer than 20 first team appearances by the age of 27.

Despite becoming a first team regular during the 1983–84 season, Parkin soon returned to being a reserve player. His final appearance for Ipswich was a League Cup defeat to Cambridge United, and he left he club in 1987. He subsequently joined Bury Town, where he played until 1990. Parkin joined Wivenhoe Town in the summer of 1990, playing 11 games until departing in September of that year for Harwich & Parkeston.

References

External links
Tommy Parkin North American Soccer League Players
Ipswich Neil Brown

1956 births
Living people
Footballers from Gateshead
English footballers
Association football midfielders
Ipswich Town F.C. players
Grimsby Town F.C. players
Peterborough United F.C. players
Connecticut Bicentennials players
Bury Town F.C. players
English Football League players
North American Soccer League (1968–1984) players
English expatriate footballers
English expatriate sportspeople in the United States
Expatriate soccer players in the United States